Bad Country is an American mystery novel written by C. B. McKenzie.

Plot
Rodeo Grace Garnet, an Arizona bounty hunter and private detective, is hired by an elderly Indian woman to help discover who murdered her grandson.

Reception 
Bad Country was called "elegantly told" by the New York Times. It received a starred review from Kirkus Reviews. It was also reviewed by Library Journal. It won the Hillerman Prize. Stephen King tweeted that he liked the author's "fresh and original voice."

References

2014 American novels
English-language novels
American detective novels
American mystery novels
2014 debut novels
Novels set in Arizona
Minotaur Books books